Lamprobyrrhulus is a genus of beetles belonging to the family Byrrhidae.

The species of this genus are found in Europe, Russia and Japan.

Species:
 Lamprobyrrhulus nitidus (Schaller, 1783)

References

Byrrhidae
Beetle genera